The 1934 Army Cadets football team represented the United States Military Academy in the 1934 college football season. In their second year under head coach Garrison H. Davidson, the Cadets compiled a 7–3 record, shut out five of their ten opponents, and outscored all opponents by a combined total of 215 to 40.  In the annual Army–Navy Game, the Midshipmen  The Cadets also lost to Notre Dame  and Illinois by a 7 to 0 score. 
 
Halfback Jack Buckler was selected by the College Sports Writers as a second-team player on the All-America team.

Schedule

References

Army
Army Black Knights football seasons
Army Cadets football